Watana Muangsook (born on 28 May 1957) is a Thai politician. He has held the positions of Minister of Social Development and Human Security, Minister of Industry, Minister of Commerce and Deputy Minister of Commerce in the government of Thailand.

Biography 
Watana Muangsook's nickname is Kai. He was born in Prachinburi. He graduated from Suankularb Wittayalai School and Chulalongkorn University. He was also a temple boy at Wat Debsirindrawas Ratchaworawiharn.

He is married to a daughter of billionaire Sumet Jiaravanon, Patchara Jiaravanon.

References 

Watana Muangsook
Living people
1957 births
Watana Muangsook
Watana Muangsook
Watana Muangsook